are Japanese woodblock prints depicting non-East Asian foreigners and scenes in the port city of Yokohama.

The port of Yokohama was opened to foreigners in 1859, and ukiyo-e artists, primarily of the Utagawa school, produced more than 800 different woodblock prints in response to a general curiosity about these strangers. The production of  ceased in the 1880s.

The most prolific artists working in this genre were Utagawa Yoshitora, Utagawa Yoshikazu, Utagawa Sadahide, Utagawa Yoshiiku, Utagawa Yoshimori, Utagawa Hiroshige II, Utagawa Hiroshige III, Utagawa Yoshitoyo, and Utagawa Yoshitomi.

Gallery

References
 Lane, Richard. (1978).  Images from the Floating World, The Japanese Print, Oxford, Oxford University Press. ;  OCLC 5246796
 Newland, Amy Reigle. (2005). Hotei Encyclopedia of Japanese Woodblock Prints,  Amsterdam, Hotei. ;  OCLC 61666175 
 Philadelphia Museum of Art, Foreigners in Japan, Yokohama and Related Woodcuts in the Philadelphia Museum of Art, Philadelphia, Philadelphia Museum of Art, 1972.
 Rijksmuseum, The Age of Yoshitoshi, Japanese Prints from the Meiji and Taishō periods, Nagasaki, Yokohama, and Kamigata prints, Amsterdam, Rijksmuseum, 1990.
 Yonemura, Ann, Yokohama, Prints from Nineteenth-century Japan, Washington, D.C., Arthur M. Sackler Gallery, 1990.

External links

 Japan and the West: Artistic Cross-Fertilization, at the Library of Congress, including examples of Yokohama-e

Ukiyo-e genres
Yokohama